Magenta (stylized MAGENTA) is the third extended play (EP) by South Korean singer and songwriter Kang Daniel. It was released on August 3, 2020 by Konnect Entertainment and distributed by Sony Music Korea. Magenta contains six tracks with "Who U Are" as its lead single. "Waves" featuring Simon Dominic and Jamie was pre-released on July 27.

Background and composition
On July 5, 2020, Konnect Entertainment posted a comeback teaser video for Magenta, the second mini album in Kang's "Color" album trilogy series. Album pre-orders began on July 13. While Cyan showed bright and refreshing colors, Magenta is described as having strong and powerful colors that capture the beginning and end of summer. Kang wanted to show onstage what many think is the most "Kang Daniel-like" and bring energy to listeners through fun dance music. He participated in writing five songs.

Inspired by dancehall and hip-hop, "Waves" has 808 bass drums, Latin guitar, and piano staccato sounds. Lyrically, the song is about succumbing to waves of emotion. "Who U Are" combines 808 bass drums, Latin guitar, flute, synthesizer, and vocal effects and talks about awakening inner emotions unknown to even oneself.

Artwork 
The album cover features two glowing magenta circles merged to form a Venn diagram. In addition, as part of the Color EP trilogy, the hex code for magenta (as well as fuchsia; #FF00FF) is on the top left corner.

Promotion
Kang revealed the "Waves" music video at his online fan meeting on July 25 prior to the official music site release. To commemorate the album's release, he held an album countdown V Live show on August 3 and virtual fan-sign events. Kang performed on all music shows and appeared on radio shows Kim Shin Young’s Song of Hope, Volume Up, and Love Game within the two weeks of promotions. He also appeared on the August 7 episode of You Hee-yeol's Sketchbook and performed "Who U Are", "Interview", as well as a brief cover of Johan Kim's hit song "I Want to Fall in Love". In addition, Kang made several appearances as a special MC and judge on KBS2's Fun-Staurant, and performed a snippet of "Who U Are". After Kang wrapped up broadcast promotions, he released a surprise music video for the B-side track "Movie".

Commercial performance
Magenta surpassed 320,000 physical album sales within a week and resulted in a Hanteo Chart official certificate.  Kang earned a Gaon triple crown by topping the album, download, and BGM weekly charts. The music video for the lead single "Who U Are" surpassed 10 million views within four days of its release, setting a personal record for Kang. The song also took first place on three music shows: The Show, Music Bank, and Show! Music Core.

Track listing

Charts

Weekly charts

Monthly charts

Year-end charts

Singles

Certifications and sales

Accolades

Music program awards

Release history

See also
List of certified albums in South Korea
List of Gaon Album Chart number ones of 2020

References

Kang Daniel albums
2020 EPs
Korean-language EPs
Sony Music EPs
Konnect Entertainment EPs